Mohammad Ali Bashe Ahangar (also Romanized as Mohammad-Ali Bashe Ahangar) (b. 1962) is an Iranian director and screenwriter.

Filmography 
 The Lost Half, 1998
 Sugar Solution, 2003
 The Child of Dust, 2007
 Dreams Awakened, 2010
 The Queen, 2012
 Under Water Cypress, 2018

References

 

Iranian film directors
Persian-language film directors
People from Dezful
1962 births
Living people